The Eparchy of Gornji Karlovac ("Eparchy of Upper Karlovac") is an eparchy of the Serbian Orthodox Church seated in the city of Karlovac, Croatia. It covers the area of Banovina, Kordun, Lika, Krbava, Gorski Kotar, as well as northern Croatia and Istria.

The important Orthodox Christian monasteries in the region are Gomirje near Ogulin and Komogovina Monastery between Glina and Kostajnica.

History

The Serbian Orthodox Ličko-Krbavska and Zrinopoljska Eparchy was established in 1695 by the Metropolitan Atanasije Ljubojević and certified by Emperor Joseph I in 1707. This eparchy (from the 19th century known as the Eparchy of Upper Karlovac) was the ecclesiastical centre of the Serbian Orthodox Church in this region, populated by Serbs, the community known at the time as "Rascians".

This eparchy was under jurisdiction of the Metropolitan of Dabar-Bosnia, directly under the restored Serbian Patriarch in Peć and after 1766 under the new Serbian Metropolitanate of Karlovci, comprising Lika, Banija and Kordun.

In 1993 the old Cathedral Church of Saint Nicholas and the eparchy's diocesan residence were destroyed by Croatians during the Croatian war of Independence.

Monasteries
Gomirje Monastery
Komogovina Monastery
Medak Monastery
Gorica Monastery
Donji Budački Monastery

Metropolitans
Atanasije Ljubojević (1688—1712)
Danilo Ljubotina (1713—1739)
Pavle Nenadović (1744—1749)
Danilo Jakšić (1751—1771)
Josif Stojanović (1771—1774)
Petar Petrović (1774—1784)
Jovan Jovanović (1783—1786)
Genadije Dimović (1786—1796)
Stefan Avakumović (1798—1801)
Petar Jovanović Vidak (1801—1806)
Mojsije Mioković (1807—1823)
Lukijan Mušicki (1828—1837)
Evgenije Jovanović (1839—1854)
Sergije Kaćanski (1858—1859)
Petar Jovanović (1859—1864)
Lukijan Nikolajević (1865—1872)
Teofan Živković (1874—1890)
Mihailo Grujić (1891—1914)
Ilarion Zeremski (1920—1931)
Maksimilijan Hajdin (1931—1936)
Sava Trlajić (1938—1941)
Nikanor Iličić (1947—1951)
Simeon Zloković (1951—1990)
Nikanor Bogunović (1991—1999)
Fotije Sladojević (2000—2004)
Gerasim Popović (2004—).

See also
 Serbs of Croatia
 Eastern Orthodoxy in Croatia
 List of the Eparchies of the Serbian Orthodox Church

Sources

External links
Official website
The diocese of Upper Karlovac - history and destruction in war
 The Serbs in the Former SR of Croatia

Serbian Orthodox Church in Croatia
Religious organizations established in 1695
Dioceses established in the 17th century
Religious sees of the Serbian Orthodox Church
Serbian minority institutions and organizations in Croatia
1695 establishments in Europe
17th-century establishments in Croatia